Wilho F. Saari (July 7, 1932 – January 19, 2022) was a Finnish American player of the kantele, the Finnish psaltery. Kreeta Haapasalo, a well-known kantele player in Finland in the 19th century, was his great-great grandmother. Wilho's father, Wilho Sr., also performed the kantele in public, only in Washington, having brought a kantele with him to America in 1915.

In 2005, Washington's governor, Christine Gregoire, awarded Saari the Governor's Heritage Award for his work popularizing and teaching the kantele. Wilho Saari is a resident of Naselle, Washington. In 2006, Saari was one of ten recipients of the National Endowment for the Arts (NEA) award of a National Heritage Fellowship, the country's highest honor in the folk and traditional arts.

Saari both taught and performed around the country. In Astoria, Oregon and Naselle, Washington he performed at FinnFest USA '06, an annual national festival, where he participated in the world premiere of a Kantele Mass composed by Jarkko Yli-Annala.

Saari was married for over 50 years to his "Roadie" Kaisa, of Kuopio, Finland. Together, they had two children. Saari also had six grandchildren. He died on January 19, 2022, at the age of 89.

References

External links 
 Washington State Arts Commission – Folk Arts – Master Artist – Wilho Saari
 Finlandia Foundation National – Wilho Saari POY 2011 Finnish Kantele

1932 births
2022 deaths
Place of birth missing
American people of Finnish descent
Kantele players
National Heritage Fellowship winners
People from Pacific County, Washington
Musicians from Washington (state)